Elif Demirezer (born 12 December 1992 in Berlin) currently known by her stage name ELIF, is a German musician of Turkish descent.

Biography 
Elif Demirezer was born as the daughter of Turkish immigrants in Berlin and is the third of four children. She grew up in the Berlin district of Moabit and attended the OSC KIM school. In addition to performing in both the school musical and the school choir, Elif took guitar lessons as a teenager. It was during that time that she wrote her first songs.

Career

Beginning as a Popstar 
At 16 years old, Demirezer competed in the eighth season of the ProSieben talent show Popstars. She made joint appearances with the All American Rejects (The Wind Blows) and Cassandra Steen (Never Knew I Needed) and finished together with her partner Niklas Dennin to earn second place in the final.

Solo career 

After Popstars, Demirezer reinforced her internet presence on Facebook and YouTube by introducing her own songs, which were mainly in German language. She also worked as a blogger for Webradio's "I Love Radio". In 2012, Demirezer joined German singer-songwriter Tim Bendzko for his November tour of German clubs. Later, in February 2013, Demirezer became the opening act for Ronan Keating during his tour of Germany. Later in the year, her first single "Unter meiner Haut" (Under My Skin) was released by Universal Music, and reached number 80 in the German single charts in mid-April. On April 7th, 2013 Elif Demirezer joined Seeed, Blumio, Glass Bead Game and Andreas Bourani at the memorial concert in Admiral Palace "I am Jonny - Voices for our Brother" commemorating the murder of Jonny K in 2012 in. In early August 2013, a single was released entitled "200 Days Summer". The video, which shows Elif along with tame elephants on the island of Sri Lanka, was directed by Justin Kruse, who worked with Ivy Quainoo, Max Herre, Max Prosa, Leslie Clio and Joy Dena Lane on previous productions. End of August 2013 the debut album "Unter meiner Haut" was released. It was produced by Demirezer herself and Philipp Schwär and reached number 23 on the German album charts. In January 2014 Elif completed her first tour through German clubs.

Discography

Studio albums

EP's 

 2013: Unter meiner Haut
 2015: Als ich fortging

Singles

As lead artist

Other singles 
 2009: Last Man Standing (Download; as Nik & Elif)
 2013: 
 2013:  (Download)
 2015: 
 2016: 
 2017: 
 2017: 
 2020: 
 2020: 
 2020: 
 2020: 
 2020: 
 2020: 
 2020: 
 2020: 
 2021:

As featured artist

Awards and nominations

Results

Sources

External links 
 Offizielle Website
 Welt-Online: Eine Frau ohne Plan B (Interview vom 28. März 2013)
 Songtexte

1992 births
Living people
German people of Turkish descent
German pop singers
German songwriters
Singers from Berlin
21st-century German women singers
German women rappers